Clepsis trifasciata is a species of moth of the family Tortricidae. It is found in Kyrgyzstan, where it was recorded at an altitude of 1,800 meters.

The wingspan is 18–19 mm. The ground colour of the forewings is creamy-white with brownish markings with a greenish hue. The hindwings are whitish, but browner on the periphery. Adults have been recorded on wing in early July.

Etymology
The species name refers to the characteristic wing pattern of the species.

References

Moths described in 2010
Clepsis